Munir Hachemi (born 1989) is a Spanish writer. He was born in Madrid to an Algerian father and studied Spanish at university. He also obtained a master's degree in Latin American studies. His fiction appeared initially in fanzines under the aegis of the Escritores Bárbaros collective. His first novel Cosas vivas appeared in 2018. In 2021, he was named by Granta magazine as one of the most promising young Spanish-language writers in the world.

References

Spanish writers
1989 births
Living people